Jiří Texl (born 3 January 1993) is a Czech football player, who currently plays as a centre midfielder for FC Zbrojovka Brno.

External links
 Profile at MSFL.cz
 

1993 births
Living people
Czech footballers
SK Sigma Olomouc players
FC Zbrojovka Brno players
MFK Vítkovice players
Association football midfielders
SFC Opava players
Czech National Football League players
Sportspeople from Třebíč